Drug Corridor is the name given to various paths across the world used for drug trafficking, often being close to major highways and interstate roads. These routes are often major highways that allow for the flow of illicit drugs into, out of, and across various countries. The term is often used as a casual reference to common drug trafficking routes, and are known to often flow through major cities. There is no definitive drug corridor, but rather a series of connected networks which span across the globe. Drug corridors are reported to have a growing impact on drug use and associated crime in areas which they travel through. One commonly known drug corridor is the Trans-American Corridor.

Trans-American Corridor
Inhabitants of the lower Midwest and South, including Missouri, Arkansas, Tennessee, Kentucky, and the Carolinas, generally dub their locales to be part of the main trans-American drug corridor, as well as those of the Southwestern U.S. states such as Arizona, New Mexico and Texas. They claim that the major flow of drugs brought in from the Atlantic coast westward flows through their states, and that they are in the main drug corridor.

References

Illegal drug trade
Smuggling routes